Giacomo Torrella (died 1521) was a Roman Catholic prelate who served as Bishop of Trevico (1497–1521).

Biography
On 27 October 1497, Giacomo Torrella was appointed during the papacy of Pope Alexander VI as Bishop of Trevico.
He served as Bishop of Trevico until his death in 1521.

References

External links and additional sources
 (for the Chronology of Bishops using non-Latin names) 
 (for the Chronology of Bishops using non-Latin names)  

15th-century Italian Roman Catholic bishops
16th-century Italian Roman Catholic bishops
Bishops appointed by Pope Alexander VI
1521 deaths